Ora is an unincorporated community in southern North Bend Township, Starke County, in the U.S. state of Indiana.

History
Although Ora is unincorporated, it has a post office, with the ZIP code of 46968. It has been in operation since 1882.

Ora is very unique. From living there my whole life, it’s definitely a family town. Everyone knows everyone. There’s never new-comers. There is an old time school house placed in the middle of the town, there was once a old time doctors office across from it, and so much more. This town has its own memories from the changes it’s been through. Seems like everyone who lives in that town, is family in some sort of way.

Geography
The community lies along CR750E southeast of the city of Knox, the county seat of Starke County.  Its elevation is 718 feet (219 m), and it is located at  (41.1739304, -86.5530654).

References

Northwest Indiana
Unincorporated communities in Starke County, Indiana
Unincorporated communities in Indiana